The Danish Golf Union (DGU) is the governing body for the sport of golf in Denmark. It manages the national golf teams, the national golf championships, and maintains the Rules of Golf in Danish.

DGU was founded in 1931 by Esbjerg Golfklub, Helsingør Golf Club, Odense Golfklub and Københavns Golf Klub, Denmark's oldest golf club founded in 1898. DGU became a member of the European Golf Association (EGA) in 1958 and is a member of Danmarks Idræts-Forbund, the National Olympic Committee and Sports Confederation of Denmark.

DGU organizes around 150,000 active golfers and around 190 golf clubs in Denmark.

Championships
DGU organizes the following championships for men and women (eligible age in brackets):
Danish Championship 
Danish Matchplay Championship 
Danish Junior Championship (under 18)
Danish Mid-Age Championship (30+)
Danish Senior Championship (50+)
Danish Veteran Championship (60+)
Danish Super Veteran Championship (70+)
Danish 2-Generation Championship
Danish GolfSixes Championship (18+)
Danish Junior GolfSixes Championship (under 18)

National Team
DGU develops and manages the Danish National Golf Team.

Notable members

See also

Made in Denmark – the leading men's golf tournament in Denmark

References

External links
 danskgolfunion.dk, official site

Denmark
Golf associations
Golf
Golf in Denmark
1931 establishments in Denmark
Sports organizations established in 1931